A form-fit, form-locking or form-closed connection is a type of mechanical connection between two parts (example: screw and screwdriver), wherein these parts  due to their forms interlock and block each other along at least one defined linear or rotational direction.

Form-fit connections are created by the interlocking of the connecting components. For example, the lid cannot slip sideways away from the pot because both interlock at the edge. On the other hand, a round lid can be rotated while sitting on the pot, because there is no form-fit against the rotation. Towards the bottom, the lid has a stop against the pot. This is a "half form-fit" because upwards it can be removed.

A form-fit acts via the geometric contact of two effective surfaces, and the effective forces are transmitted as normal forces to the effective surfaces of a driver part (surface pressure and Hertzian contact stress). Typically, some manufacturing-related tolerance occurs in the connection during form-fit.

In a form-fit connection, one connection partner blocks the movement of the other. Such "blocking" occurs in at least one direction. If a second pair of surfaces is arranged opposite, the opposite direction is also blocked.

Examples 

 Tongue and groove
 Zipper

References 

Mechanical engineering
Metalworking terminology

de:Verbindungstechnik#Formschluss